The 1938 Phillip Island Grand Prix was a motor race staged at the Phillip Island triangular circuit in Victoria, Australia on Labor Day, 28 March 1938. The race was contested over 35 laps, approximately 116 miles. It was staged by the Victorian Sporting Car Club and was contested on a handicap basis with the first car, driven by G.A. Cowper, starting 29 minutes and 45 seconds before the last car, driven by G.M. Joshua.

The race was won by Arthur Beasley driving a Singer Le Mans.

Results

Key. 
NC:  Still running at finish but not classified as finisher 
DNF: Did not finish 
Dsq: Disqualified 
DNS: Did not start

Notes
 There were 17 starters in the race. 
 Limit starter: G.A. Cowper (Morris)
 Scratch starter: G.M. Joshua (Frazer Nash)
 Nine competitors were on the course at the finish. 
 Only five competitors finished the course in the required time.
 Winner's average speed: 60 mph
 Fastest Time: J. Phillips (Ford V8), 1h 44m 21s (66.6 mph)
 Fastest Lap: H. Beith (Terraplane) and J. Phillips (Ford V8)

References

Phillip Island Grand Prix
Motorsport at Phillip Island